Punto de Vista (Point of View) was an Argentine literary journal founded in 1978 during the height of the military regime headed by General Jorge Videla. Taking advantage of the slight lessening of censorship after Argentina's 1978 FIFA World Cup soccer victory, the journal, whose contributors were pseudonymous, focused on art and politics, stressing culture over ideology both because it was safer to do so under the extant political conditions, and because its editors were becoming disillusioned with orthodox Marxism.

Its leading figure was Beatriz Sarlo, who remained associated with the journal. After the dictatorship weakened its control in the early 1980s, the contributors began to write in their own name. Though the centrality of the journal declined after the return of democracy made the daily newspapers and their weekend supplements once again accessible to left-leaning intellectuals, it remained one of the leading literary and cultural journals in the Spanish-speaking world.

The journal closed down after 30 years in 2008 and 90 issues.

References

External links
 
 
 WorldCat record

1978 establishments in Argentina
2008 disestablishments in Argentina
Literary magazines published in Argentina
Defunct literary magazines
Defunct magazines published in Argentina
Magazines established in 1978
Magazines disestablished in 2008
Spanish-language magazines